Chamrousse is a ski resort in southeastern France, in the Belledonne mountain range near Grenoble in the Isère department.

Population

Olympics
Chamrousse hosted the six alpine skiing events of the 1968 Winter Olympics, where Jean-Claude Killy of France won three gold medals in the men's events.

Skiing at Chamrousse
There are also  of trails for cross-country skiing. Cross-country skiing can be practised from the opening of the resort to early or mid-April.

Cycle racing

Details of the climb
There are several sections in excess off 11% in the early stages of the climb.

The ski station can also be reached by a more northerly route, from Uriage-les-Bains via Saint-Martin-d'Uriage. This climb is  gaining  in elevation, at an average gradient of 7.2%.

Tour de France
The climb of Chamrousse was used in the mountain time-trial in the 2001 Tour de France. Lance Armstrong won the stage (#11) on 18 July 2001, when he took just over an hour to complete the hors catégorie climb from Grenoble to the ski resort. In 2012, Armstrong was disqualified from winning this stage, following the Lance Armstrong doping case.

The ski station was re-visited by the race on 18 July 2014. The winner of the  stage 13 from Saint-Étienne was the Italian Vincenzo Nibali who increased his lead over his nearest rivals, with Richie Porte, who began the day second overall, losing nine minutes on the climb.

References

External links

  
 guide web touristique 

Ski resorts in France
Venues of the 1968 Winter Olympics
Olympic alpine skiing venues
Communes of Isère
Sports venues in Isère